Gazna Sara (also Romanized as Gaznā Sarā and Geznesera; also known as Kaznā Sarā) is a village in Natel-e Restaq Rural District, Chamestan District, Nur County, Mazandaran Province, Iran. At the 2006 census, its population was 19, in 6 families.

References 

Populated places in Nur County